The Chief of Staff of the Republic of Korea Air Force (Korean: ,), is the professional head of the Republic of Korea Air Force (ROKAF) since its foundation in 1949, originally held by a Lieutenant General, then by a Four-star General since 1968.

The duty of the Chief of Staff is to direct and supervise the Air Force (not including operation units) by order of the Minister of National Defense according to Article 10, Act on the Organization of National Armed Forces.

The appointment of the Chief of Staff, along with the Chiefs of Staff of the Army, the Chief of Naval Operations and the Chairman of the Joint Chiefs of Staff, is referred to the State Council of South Korea for deliberation according to Article 89, Constitution of South Korea.

List

References 

Korea, South